Alexandria Mall is a shopping mall located in Alexandria, Louisiana, United States. It features Dillard's, JCPenney, Conn's, Burlington Coat Factory, and Bed Bath And Beyond as anchor stores.

Mall history
Built by Buddy Tudor's family-owned construction company from Pineville, Alexandria Mall opened in 1973 with JCPenney, Sears, Beall-Ladymon (a chain based in Shreveport, Louisiana), and local department stores Weiss & Goldring, Green's and Wellan's. At the time, the mall also featured a two screened Cinema called Cinema I & II and was run by General Cinema Corporation.

An expansion, completed in 1986, added the department stores Dillard's and Mervyn's, and several additional stores and a food court. Clothing store Stein Mart and Sam Goody later opened in the Wellan's space. In honor of the mall's expansion, local pizza chefs cooked a  pizza.

Beall-Ladymon was acquired and renamed by Stage Stores in 1994. In 2004, the mall was sold to J. Herzog Properties of Denver, Colorado, Jones Lang Lasalle took over leasing and management in 2010.

Stein Mart closed on April 30, 2006, followed soon by the closure of Mervyn's. In March 2007, Burlington Coat Factory opened in the former Mervyn's location, while Weiss & Goldring relocated outside the mall. Bed Bath & Beyond opened in 2008 in the previous location of Weiss & Goldring. The previous Stein Mart location used to house a children's play place called Slinkee's. Both Slinkee's and the neighboring Lagniappe Theater Company, who had moved into the former Stein Mart and Sam Goody retail locations respectively (both locations having been part of the original Wellan's space), were forced to move out, in preparation for a new anchor tenant, that could be a Conn's. It was eventually revealed that a Conn's would move into the Alexandria Mall in 2016.

On May 31, 2018, it was announced that Sears would be closing as part of a plan to close 72 stores nationwide. The store closed in September 2018.

It was announced that the Stage located in the mall would be closing early 2019. It is now closed.

References

External links
Alexandria Mall Official Website

Shopping malls established in 1973
Shopping malls in Louisiana
JLL (company)
Buildings and structures in Alexandria, Louisiana
Tourist attractions in Alexandria, Louisiana